António Mascarenhas was the 14th Governor of Portuguese Ceylon. Mascarenhas was appointed in 1638 under Philip III of Portugal, he was Governor until 1640. He was succeeded by Filipe Mascarenhas.

References

Governors of Portuguese Ceylon
16th-century Portuguese people
17th-century Portuguese people